Artistic Creation is a 1901 British short  silent comedy film, directed by Walter R. Booth, featuring a lightning sketch artist drawing a picture of a woman which comes to life piece by piece. The film, "is one of the earliest examples of a film about an artist's creations coming to life," and according to Michael Brooke of BFI Screenonline, "a metaphorical cautionary tale about the responsibilities that should be borne by both creative artists and indeed the male sex in general."

References

External links

1901 films
British black-and-white films
British silent short films
1901 comedy films
1901 short films
Articles containing video clips
British comedy short films
Silent comedy films